Jaguar Bingham (known mononymously as Jaguar) is a British disc jockey and radio presenter who presents on BBC Radio 1.

Career 
Jaguar presented on student radio while at university in Leeds. At the age of 19, she started an internship at BBC Radio 1 and 1Xtra. She also had work experience at Mixmag in 2015 and was their weekend editor for two years before hosting the Mixmag’s weekly office party The Lab LDN. In 2021 Mixmag crowned Jaguar Broadcaster of the year and she won DJ Mag’s Best of British Best Radio Show award by public vote. 

At Radio 1, Jaguar has worked in the BBC Introducing team. In April 2020, she began presenting the Introducing Dance show on Sunday nights. In September 2021, the show moved to Thursday nights as part of a wider timetable reshuffle.

Personal life 
Jaguar is from the tiny island of Alderney in the Channel Islands and went to school in Hampshire from the age of 10. She now lives in East London.

References

External links 
BBC Introducing on Radio 1 Dance (BBC Radio 1)

BBC Radio 1 presenters
British radio presenters
British DJs
LGBT DJs
English LGBT people